Cressbrook Creek is a rural locality in the Toowoomba Region, Queensland, Australia.

See also
 List of tramways in Queensland

References 

Toowoomba Region
Localities in Queensland